Chaouki Tanios Abdallah is a Lebanese-American engineer and academic administrator who served as the 22nd President of the University of New Mexico.

Early life and education 
Abdallah was born and raised in Lebanon. He began his education at the Saint Joseph University before earning a Bachelor of Engineering degree from Youngstown State University. Abdallah earned a Master of Science and PhD in Electrical Engineering from Georgia Tech.

Career 
Abdallah was active in designing international graduate programs with Latin American and European countries. In 1990, he co-founded the Ibero-American Science and Technology Education Consortium (ISTEC), which includes more than 150 universities in Latin America, Spain and the United States.

Abdallah's teaching and research speciality is systems theory, particularly related to robotic control and communications systems. He is a recipient of the Millennium Medal of the Institute of Electrical and Electronics Engineers. He has published more than 300 peer-reviewed papers and seven books, including Robot Manipulator Control: Theory and Practice (2003, with Lewis and Dawson).

He joined UNM's Electrical and Computer Engineering department, chairing the department between 2005 and 2011. He served as provost of the UNM between 2011 and 2016, after which he became president from 2017 to 2018, initially in an acting capacity. Abdallah left the University of New Mexico to serve as executive vice president for research at Georgia Tech.

References

American people of Lebanese descent
University of New Mexico faculty
Living people
Year of birth missing (living people)